Tawlli Qaqa (Quechua tawlli  a kind of legume, qaqa rock,  "tawlli rock", also spelled Taullijaja) is a mountain in the Cordillera Blanca in the Andes of Peru which reaches a height of approximately . It is located in the Ancash Region, Huaylas Province, Santa Cruz District. Tawlli Qaqa lies at the Yuraqmayu valley (Santa Cruz gorge) south of Kitarahu, southwest of Kitaqucha (Quechua for "dam lake") and northwest of Hatunqucha (Quechua for "big lake").

References

Mountains of Peru
Mountains of Ancash Region